Jan Stanisław Ekier (29 August 1913 – 15 August 2014) was a Polish pianist and composer known for his authoritative edition of Chopin's music for the Chopin National Edition.

Biography 
Ekier was born in Kraków, Poland. As a youth, he studied piano with Olga Stolfowa, and later composition with Bernardino Rizzi at the Władysław Żeleński School of Music. He continued formal music studies at the Warsaw Conservatory, where his teachers included Zbigniew Drzewiecki (piano) and Kazimierz Sikorski (composition). He was awarded the III International Chopin Piano Competition's 8th prize in 1937. He was later an organ student with Bronisław Rutkowski.

In 1959, he started the project of a new critical edition of Chopin's works that later became the Chopin National Edition. From 1967 to 2010, the entirety of Chopin's known works were published in 37 volumes, accompanied by source and performance commentaries. In 2004, he received a special award from the Minister of Culture of Poland, "in recognition of his outstanding contribution to the preservation and popularization of the legacy of Fryderyk Chopin, in particular for the monumental edition of the National Edition of the Works of Fryderyk Chopin, restoring to European culture the art of the great Polish composer in a form closest to its historical original."

On 17 April 2000, Ekier was awarded the Commander's Cross with Star of the Order of Polonia Restituta. On 21 October 2010, he received the Order of the White Eagle.

His first wife was the Polish actress Danuta Szaflarska. Ekier died in Warsaw, two weeks short of his 101st birthday.

Among his students are Bronisława Kawalla, Piotr Paleczny, Alicja Paleta-Bugaj and Yuko Kawai.

References

External links
 The Fryderyk Chopin Institute, profile of Jan Ekier

See also
 List of centenarians (musicians, composers and music patrons)

1913 births
2014 deaths
Polish composers
Polish centenarians
Polish classical pianists
Male classical pianists
Warsaw Uprising insurgents
Commanders with Star of the Order of Polonia Restituta
20th-century classical pianists
20th-century male musicians
Recipients of the Order of the White Eagle (Poland)
Men centenarians